Ragnar Frisk (1902–1984) was a Swedish film director. He was known for his comedies, including the Åsa-Nisse series of films.

Selected filmography
 A Cruise in the Albertina (1938)
 Tomorrow's Melody (1942)
 Guttersnipes (1944)
 100 dragspel och en flicka (1946)
 Åsa-Nisse (1949)
Åsa-Nisse Goes Hunting (1950)
 Perhaps a Gentleman (1950)
 Åsa-Nisse on Holiday (1953)
 Åsa-Nisse in Military Uniform (1958)
 Åsa-Nisse as a Policeman (1960)
 Andersson's Kalle on Top Form (1973)

References

Bibliography 
 John Sundholm. Historical Dictionary of Scandinavian Cinema. Scarecrow Press, 2012.

External links 
 

1902 births
1984 deaths
Swedish film directors
People from Stockholm
20th-century Swedish people